Prudence is an unincorporated community and coal town in Fayette County, West Virginia, United States.

The community was named after Prudence McGuffin, the daughter of an early settler.

References 

Unincorporated communities in West Virginia
Coal towns in West Virginia
Unincorporated communities in Fayette County, West Virginia